Alfred James Bowerman (22 November 1873 – 20 June 1947) was an English cricketer who played two first-class matches for Somerset in the early 20th century, and also played in the only cricket match at the Olympic Games, at the 1900 Summer Olympics in Paris.

Personal life 
Alfred James Bowerman was born in Broomfield, Somerset on 22 November 1873. After attending Blundell's School in Tiverton, Devon, he worked as a timber merchant in the Bridgwater area. He married Frances Mabel (née Long) in 1895. In 1910, he was taken to court over a gambling debt, and two years later he sold his timber business and emigrated with his family to Australia in December 1912 to establish a new career as a farmer. He served in the First World War as part of the Australian Imperial Force, active in the Middle East. In October 1946, while a resident at Eventide Nursing Home, he was hospitalised after a fall, and fractured his skull. He died the following year, on 20 June 1947 in Brisbane, Queensland.

First-class cricket 
Bowerman played twice for Somerset as an amateur. In 1900, he played against Lancashire and five years later, he appeared against Middlesex, scoring eight runs in four innings and taking one catch. In his biography of the player, the Somerset cricket historian Stephen Hill describes Bowerman as "a decent club cricketer".

Olympic career 

He played for the Devon Wanderers team that represented Great Britain in the 1900 Summer Olympics cricket competition, the only time that cricket has featured in the Olympics. In the only game against France, Bowerman scored seven in the first innings, and in the second innings he scored 59, the top score of the match as Great Britain picked up the gold medal.

Notes

References

External links

Alfred Bowerman's profile at Sports Reference.com

1873 births
1947 deaths
English cricketers
Somerset cricketers
English Olympic medallists
Olympic cricketers of Great Britain
Cricketers at the 1900 Summer Olympics
Olympic gold medallists for Great Britain
People from Sedgemoor (district)
Medalists at the 1900 Summer Olympics